The World Strongman Federation ("WSF") is a worldwide organization within strength athletics, founded by Vlad Redkin, a prominent figure in the history of the International Federation of Strength Athletes and World Strongman Cup Federation. The WSF has organised a number of grand prix events and national championships featuring some of the world's leading strength athletes including 5 time World's Strongest Man winner Mariusz Pudzianowski, Brian Shaw, Mikhail Koklyaev, Krzysztof Radzikowski, Tarmo Mitt, Kevin Nee, Stefan Solvi Petursson, Laurence Shahlaei and Mark Felix. The WSF's flagship programme is the WSF World Cup.

History
The WSF was set up in 2007 by Vlad Redkin following a financial dispute with the World Strongman Cup Federation. Following Vlad's departure, the WSCF ceased to promote events and effectively disappeared from the strength athletics landscape. In September 2007 an event in Khanty-Mansijsk formerly affiliated to WSCF and featuring its athletes was promoted by Vlad Redkin. This event had its name changed at short notice from WSCF to the Grand Prix of Khanty-Mansijsk (Russia) and in effect was the first WSF event. The reason given after the competition by Redkin was that a combination of financial reasons as well as concerns over WSCF's stated aim of forming closer ties with the International Federation of Strength Athletes led him to part company with WSCF. He initially planned to cooperate closely with Strongman Super Series in 2008, but in fact set up a new federation called the World Strongman Federation.

In 2008 the WSF organised a World Cup, it featured Mariusz Pudzianowski amongst others. However, the inaugural season failed to attract as many top tier names as planned and the WSF World Cup season was reduced in scale. By the end of 2008 the new federation was organising one off grand prix events largely based in the countries of the former Soviet Union, featuring fields of athletes confined to those countries.

In 2011 the WSF began to exert its presence globally once more and a WSF Asian World Cup event was organised, with Tarmo Mitt winning the event and also featuring the comeback event for Kevin Nee who finished third.

In August 2011 Redkin stated that WSF had an agreement between 8 countries in that time and more were being approached in order to once again stage a WSF World Cup. This materialised and in August 2011 the 2011/12 World Cup was begun.

World Cup

2008

2010

2011

World Cup

World Team Cup

Other competitions

2012

World Cup

Other competitions

World Team Cup/Team Championships

2013

World Cup

World Team Cup

Other competitions

WSF World Strongmen Championships

2012
The first ever WSF World Strongmen Championship was held February 12–14, 2012 in Abu Dhabi under the patronage of His Highness Sheikh Hamdan Bin Mohammed Bin Hamdan Al Nahyan. The contest consisted of 25 athletes, after day 1 the field was cut down to 15 athletes, and down to 8 athletes after day 2. The scores were reset to zero after each day of competition, and the finals were held on Feb. 14, 2012.

Athletes
Tarmo Mitt (Estonia)
Mark Felix (UK)
Laurence Shahlaei (UK)
Josh Thigpen (USA)
Richard van der Linden (Netherlands)
Nikolai Hansen (Denmark)
Elbrus Nigmatullin (Russia)
Antanas Abrutis (Lithuania)
Oleksandr Lashyn (Ukraina)
Aleksandr Lapyrov (Belarus)
Kevin Nee (USA)
Juanjo Diaz Garcia (Spain)
Sergey Trubitsin (Uzbekistan)
Rolands Gulbis (Latvia)
Krzysztof Radzikowski (Poland)
Vusal Mardanov (Azerbaijan)
Adam Darasz (Hungary)
Vladimir Rizov (Bulgaria)
Stefan Solvi Petursson (Iceland)
Farzad Mousakhani (Iran)
Mika Jaakola (Finland)
Alexander Mantserov (Russia)
Marc Wells (Australia)
Gregor Stegnar (Slovenia)
Ricardo Nortt (Brazil)

Day 1 results
Date: 12 February 2012
Dubai, UAE

Day 2 results
Date: 13 February 2012
Dubai, UAE

Day 3/Final placings
Date: 14 February 2012
Dubai, UAE

2013
The 2013 WSF World Championships are scheduled to be held in December, and will also be the finals for the 2013 WSF World Cup. The contest is scheduled to take place in the United Arab Emirates.

Grand Prix of Khanty-Mansijsk
Originally, another event in Khanty-Mansijsk in September 2007 was affiliated to WSMC and featured its athletes. However, the promoter of the event, Vlad Redkin, changed the name from WSMC to the Grand Prix of Khanty-Mansijsk (Russia). The reason given was that after the competition Redkin was parting company with WSMC due to his concerns over WSMC wanting closer ties with the International Federation of Strength Athletes. He also cited that he had lost money with WSMC. He initially planned to cooperate closely with the World Strongman Super Series in 2008, but in fact set up a new federation called the World Strongman Federation.

Date: 8 September 2007

2014

2015 

The new President of WSF Pradeep Baba Madhok quotes “Our distinct target audience, apart from strength enthusiasts, that we aim to give utmost priority to is children and the youth, making them well informed on the importance of nutrition and fitness at a very young age. WSF solely stands by the principal of strength and with that in mind, we hope to inspire the forthcoming generations to reach their dreams.”

2016 
WSF World Cup 2016 season plan:

10/04 – Varanasi, India

03/07 – Minsk, Belarus

07/08 – Krynica Zdroj, Poland

08/08 – Omsk, Russia

TBD – European Championship of StrongFit Budapest, Hungary

TBD – ArcticMan 2016, Russia

TBD – Jordan

TBD – UAE

TBD – Qatar

TBD – Los Angeles, USA

See also
 World's Strongest Man

References

Strength athletics organizations
Strongmen competitions